Base Presidente Eduardo Frei Montalva is the most important Antarctic base of Chile. It is located at Fildes Peninsula, an ice-free area, in front of Fildes Bay, west of King George Island, South Shetland Islands. The base is located in the Chilean commune of Antártica, which is the Antarctic territory claimed by Chile (Antártica Chilena Province, Magallanes y la Antártica Chilena Region).

Also nearby are the bases of Great Wall (China), General Artigas Station (Uruguay), King Sejong Station (Republic of Korea), Carlini Base (Argentina), Commandante Ferraz (Brazil), Henryk Arctowski (Poland) and Machu Picchu Base (Peru). Further away is Captain Arturo Prat Base, also Chilean, 50 km to the west.

Description
It has a -long airstrip (Teniente Rodolfo Marsh Martin Aerodrome, ICAO Code SCRM), with 50 intercontinental and 150 intracontinental flights each season, serving as a means of transport to many nearby bases. It also includes the Villa Las Estrellas residential area that has a hospital, a school, a bank, a small supermarket, etc. The maximum population during summer is of 150 people, and the average during winter is of about 80 people.

It began to operate in 1969 as Centro Meteorológico Eduardo Frei. When the installations were expanded, it was renamed as Base Teniente Rodolfo Marsh, with the meteorology center keeping its original name. During the 1990 decade, all of the installations came to be named Base Presidente Eduardo Frei Montalva, with the airstrip retaining the name Teniente Rodolfo Marsh.

Climate
Like the coastal areas of Antarctic Peninsula and the subantarctic islands south of the 60º parallel, the area has a tundra climate, that could be considerably borderline "maritime-influenced polar climate", thanks to temperatures that rarely drop below  in winter (which is commonplace in most of Antarctica), and temperatures that could soar a few digits above freezing for most parts of the year. The base's area and its vicinity (the entire island, actually) experiences a rather heavy precipitation, with an average precipitation rate of  yearly, which makes it unusual on the Antarctic continent, as the continent is significantly drier than the islands are to the north.

See also

 List of lighthouses in Antarctica
 List of Antarctic research stations
 List of Antarctic field camps

References

External links
 Official website Chilean Antarctic Institute
  Webcam Teniente Martin airport 

Outposts of the South Shetland Islands
Argentine Antarctica
British Antarctic Territory
Chilean Antarctic Territory
Lighthouses in Antarctica
1969 establishments in Antarctica